The 2018 Minnesota House of Representatives election was held in the U.S. state of Minnesota on November 6, 2018, to elect members to the House of Representatives of the 91st Minnesota Legislature. A primary election was held in several districts on August 14, 2018. The election coincided with the election for governor, a special election for the Minnesota Senate, and other elections.

The Minnesota Democratic–Farmer–Labor Party (DFL) won a majority of seats, ending the Republican majority that began with the 2014 election. The new legislature convened on January 8, 2019.

Background
The last election resulted in the Republicans winning a majority of 76 seats, increasing the majority of 72 seats it won in 2014. It was the first time that a party has retained control of the House of Representatives since the DFL in the 2008 election. In conjunction with the result of the Senate election, it also resulted in the return of all-Republican control of the Legislature since 2012—only the second time the Republicans have held control of both houses since the return of partisan elections to the House in 1974 and the Senate in 1976 and marking the end of two years of split control between a Republican-held House and a DFL-held Senate.

A special election was held for District 32B on February 14, 2017, following the invalidation of its general election results. On September 8, 2016, the Minnesota Supreme Court found Republican incumbent Bob Barrett ineligible for election because he did not reside in his district. As the ruling occurred within 80 days of the general election, Barrett's name could not be replaced on the ballot. Republican Anne Neu won the special election, increasing the Republican majority to 77 seats.

Electoral system
The 134 members of the House of Representatives were elected from single-member districts by first-past-the-post voting to two-year terms. Contested nominations of the DFL and Republican parties for each district were determined by an open primary election. Minor-party and independent candidates were nominated by petition. Write-in candidates had to file a request with the secretary of state's office for votes for them to be counted. The filing period was from May 22 through June 5, 2018.

Retiring members

Republican
 Matt Dean, 38B
 Joe Hoppe, 47B
 Jeff Howe, 13A: To seek election to be District 13's senator in the Minnesota Senate.
 Jim Newberger, 15B: To seek election to be Minnesota's Class 1 U.S. senator.
 Joyce Peppin, 34A: Resigned effective July 2, 2018, to join the Minnesota Rural Electric Association as director of government affairs and general counsel.
 Mark Uglem, 36A
 Abigail Whelan, 35A

DFL
 Susan Allen, 62B
 Jon Applebaum, 44B
 David Bly, 20B
 Karen Clark, 62A
 Peggy Flanagan, 46A: To seek election to be lieutenant governor as Tim Walz's running mate.
 Debra Hilstrom, 40B: To seek election to be attorney general.
 Clark Johnson, 19A
 Sheldon Johnson, 67B
 Erin Maye Quade, 57A: To seek election to be lieutenant governor as Erin Murphy's running mate.
 Jason Metsa, 6B: To seek election to be Minnesota's 8th congressional district representative.
 Erin Murphy, 64A: To seek election to be governor.
 Ilhan Omar, 60B: To seek election to be Minnesota's 5th congressional district representative.
 Paul Rosenthal, 49B: Resigned effective September 5, 2018, to become the director of external affairs for Western Governors University.
 Linda Slocum, 50A
 Paul Thissen, 61B: Resigned effective April 20, 2018, to become a justice of the Minnesota Supreme Court.
 JoAnn Ward, 53A

Competitive districts
MinnPost and MPR News considered a total of 18 House districts competitive in 2018, based on past election results, campaign spending trends, and conversations with campaigns. MinnPost considered 15 districts competitive, 11 of which were held by the Republicans and four by the DFL. According to MinnPost, their list was not exhaustive and could have spoken to broader trends in the election. MPR News also considered 15 districts competitive, 12 of which were held by the Republicans and three by the DFL.

Primary elections results
A primary election was held in 21 districts to nominate Republican and DFL candidates. Eight Republican nominations and 14 DFL nominations were contested. Seven incumbents were opposed for their party's nomination. Notably, District 55A Republican incumbent Bob Loonan lost his party's nomination.

Results

District results

Seats changing parties

Aftermath
On November 8, 2018, the newly elected House DFL caucus met to elect the leadership of the new House. House DFL Leader Melissa Hortman was elected speaker-designate unopposed. Ryan Winkler was elected majority leader and Liz Olson majority whip. The next day, the newly elected House Republican caucus met and elected outgoing Speaker Kurt Daudt minority leader, a position he held from 2013 to 2015.

See also
 Minnesota gubernatorial election, 2018
 Minnesota Senate District 13 special election, 2018
 Minnesota elections, 2018
 Minnesota Senate election, 2016

Notes

References

External links
 Elections & Voting - Minnesota Secretary of State

2018 Minnesota elections
Minnesota House of Representatives elections
Minnesota House of Representatives